Foreign trade of the United States comprises the international imports and exports of the United States. The country is among the top three global importers and exporters.

The regulation of trade is constitutionally vested in the United States Congress. After the Great Depression, the country emerged as among the most significant global trade policy-makers, and it is now a partner to a number of international trade agreements, including the General Agreement on Tariffs and Trade (GATT) and the World Trade Organization (WTO). Gross U.S. assets held by foreigners were $16.3 trillion as of the end of 2006 (over 100% of GDP).

Introduction
The country has trade relations with many other countries. Within that, the trade with Europe and Asia is predominant. To fulfill the demands of the industrial sector, the country has to import mineral oil and iron ore on a large scale. Machinery, cotton yarn, toys, mineral oil, lubricants, steel, tea, sugar, coffee, and many more items are traded. The country's export list includes food grains like wheat, corn, and soybean. Aeroplane, cars, computers, paper, and machine tools required for different industries. In 2016 United States current account balance was −$469,400,000,000. US manufacturers exported $1,365.31 billion in goods exports in 2019,with Canada, Mexico, China, Japan and the United Kingdom representing 35.44% of the export market.

Relatively few US companies export; a 2009 study reported that 18% of US manufacturers export their goods. Exporting is concentrated to a small number of companies: the largest 1% of US companies that export comprise 81% of US exports.

History

The authority of Congress to regulate international trade is set out in the United States Constitution (Article I, Section 8, Paragraph 1):  The Congress shall have power To lay and collect Taxes, Duties, Imposts and Excises, to pay the Debts and provide for the common Defence and to promote the
 general Welfare of the United States; but all Duties, Imposts and Excises shall be uniform throughout the United States

Congressional authority over international trade includes the power to impose tariffs and to establish tariff rates; implementing trade agreements; providing remedies against unfairly traded imports; controlling the export of sensitive technology and extending tariff preferences to imports from developing countries. Over time, and under carefully prescribed circumstances, Congress has delegated some of its trade authority to the Executive Branch. Congress, however, has, in some cases, kept tight reins on the use of this authority by requiring that certain trade laws and programs be renewed; and by requiring the Executive Branch to issue reports to Congress so the latter can monitor the implementation of the trade laws and programs. The Embargo Act of 1807 was designed to force Britain to rescind its restrictions on American trade, but failed, and was repealed in early 1809.

During the Civil War, leaders of the Confederacy were confident that Britain would come to their aid because of British reliance on Southern cotton. The Union was able to avoid this, through skillful use of diplomacy and threats to other aspects of European-U.S. trade relations.

Near the end of the Second World War U.S. policy makers began to experiment on a broader level. In the 1940s, working with the British government, the United States developed two innovations to expand and govern trade among nations: the General Agreement on Tariffs and Trade (GATT) and the International Trade Organization (ITO). GATT was a temporary multilateral agreement designed to provide a framework of rules and a forum to negotiate trade barrier reductions among nations.

The growing importance of international trade led to the establishment of the Office of the U.S. Trade Representative in 1963 by Executive Order 11075, originally called The Office of the Special Representative for Trade Negotiations.

Trade policy

United States trade policy has varied widely through various American historical and industrial periods. As a major developed nation, the U.S. has relied heavily on the import of raw materials and the export of finished goods. Because of the significance for American economy and industry, much weight has been placed on trade policy by elected officials and business leaders.

International trade also influences the U.S. presidential election since voters’ exposure to trade influences who wins the US presidency, according to US Census data covering nearly all economic activity in the United States. Moreover, employees in high-wage tradable goods and services sectors are more likely to support incumbent presidents and their parties, whereas those in low-wage manufacturing jobs will be more likely to support the opposition.

The 1920s marked a decade of economic growth in the United States following a Classical supply side policy. U.S. President Warren Harding signed the Emergency Tariff of 1921 and the Fordney–McCumber Tariff of 1922. Harding's policies reduced taxes and protected U.S. business and agriculture. Following the Great Depression and World War II, the United Nations Monetary and Financial Conference brought the Bretton Woods currency agreement followed by the economy of the 1950s and 1960s. In 1971, President Richard Nixon ended U.S. ties to Bretton Woods, leaving the U.S. with a floating fiat currency. The stagflation of the 1970s saw a U.S. economy characterized by slower GDP growth. In 1988, the United States ranked first in the world in the Economist Intelligence Unit "quality of life index" and third in the Economic Freedom of the World Index.

Over the long run, nations with trade surpluses tend also to have a savings surplus. The U.S. generally has developed lower savings rates than its trading partners, which have tended to have trade surpluses. Germany, France, Japan, and Canada have maintained higher savings rates than the U.S. over the long run.

Some economists believe that GDP and employment can be dragged down by an over-large deficit over the long run. Others believe that trade deficits are good for the economy. The opportunity cost of a forgone tax base may outweigh perceived gains, especially where artificial currency pegs and manipulations are present to distort trade.

In 2006, the primary economic concerns focused on: high national debt ($9 trillion), high non-bank corporate debt ($9 trillion), high mortgage debt ($9 trillion), high financial institution debt ($12 trillion), high unfunded Medicare liability ($30 trillion), high unfunded Social Security liability ($12 trillion), high external debt (amount owed to foreign lenders) and a serious deterioration in the United States net international investment position (NIIP) (−24% of GDP), high trade deficits, and a rise in illegal immigration.

These issues have raised concerns among economists and unfunded liabilities were mentioned as a serious problem facing the United States in the President's 2006 State of the Union address. On June 26, 2009, Jeff Immelt, the CEO of General Electric, called for the U.S. to increase its manufacturing base employment to 20% of the workforce, commenting that the U.S. has outsourced too much in some areas and can no longer rely on the financial sector and consumer spending to drive demand.

In 1985, the U.S. had just begun a growing trade deficit with China. During the 1990s, the U.S. trade deficit became a more excessive long-run trade deficit, mostly with Asia. By 2012, the U.S. trade deficit, fiscal budget deficit, and federal debt increased to record or near-record levels following the implementation of broad unconditional or unilateral U.S. free trade policies and formal trade agreements in the preceding decades.

The US last had a trade surplus in 1975. 

The balance of trade in the United States has been a concern among economists and business people. Warren Buffett, founder of Berkshire Hathaway, was quoted in the Associated Press (January 20, 2006) as saying "The U.S. trade deficit is a bigger threat to the domestic economy than either the federal budget deficit or consumer debt and could lead to political turmoil... Right now, the rest of the world owns $3 trillion more of us than we own of them."

In both a 1987 guest editorial to the Omaha-World Herald and a more detailed 2003 Fortune article, Buffett proposed a tool called Import Certificates as a solution to the United States' problem and ensure balanced trade. "The rest of the world owns a staggering $2.5 trillion more of the U.S. than we own of other countries. Some of this $2.5 trillion is invested in claim checks—U.S. bonds, both governmental and private—and some in such assets as property and equity securities."

In 2013 the United States' largest trading partner was Canada. China has seen substantial economic growth in the past 50 years and though a nuclear-security summit that took place in early 2010 President Obama hoped to ensure another 50 years of growth between the two countries. On April 19, 2010, President Obama met with China's paramount leader Hu Jintao to discuss trade policies between the two countries.

Though the US trade deficit has been stubborn, and tends to be the largest by dollar volume of any nation, even the most extreme months as measured by percent of GDP there are nations that are far more noteworthy.  Case in point, post 2015 Nepal earthquake, Nepal's trade gap (in goods & services) was a shocking 33.3% of GDP although heavy remittances considerably offset that number. According to the US Department of Commerce Bureau of Economic Analysis (BEA), January 27, 2017 report, the GDP "increased 4.0 percent, or $185.5 billion, in the fourth quarter of 2016 to a level of $18,860.8 billion."

In 2018, the year that a trade war with China was launched by U.S. President Donald Trump, the U.S. trade deficit in goods reached $891 billion, which was the largest on record before the $1,183 billion deficit in the trade of goods recorded in 2021. By the end of the Trump presidency, the trade war was widely characterized as a failure.

Customs territory
The main customs territory of the United States includes the 50 states, the District of Columbia, and the territory of Puerto Rico, with the exception of over 200 foreign trade zones designated to encourage economic activity. People and goods entering this territory are subject to inspection by U.S. Customs and Border Protection. The remaining insular areas are separate customs territories administered largely by local authorities:
 American Samoa
 Guam
 Northern Mariana Islands
 United States Minor Outlying Islands (mostly uninhabited)
 United States Virgin Islands

Transportation of certain living things or agricultural products may be prohibited even within a customs territory. This is enforced by U.S. Customs and Border Protection, the federal Animal and Plant Health Inspection Service, and even state authorities such as the California Department of Food and Agriculture.

Investment in the United States

Gross U.S. assets held by foreigners were $16.3 trillion as of the end of 2006 (over 100% of GDP). The U.S. net international investment position (NIIP) became a negative $2.5 trillion at the end of 2006, or about minus 19% of GDP.

This figure rises as long as the U.S. maintains an imbalance in trade, when the value of imports substantially outweighs the value of exports. This external debt does not result mostly from loans to Americans or the American government, nor is it consumer debt owed to non-U.S. creditors. It is an accounting entry that largely represents U.S. domestic assets purchased with trade dollars and owned overseas, largely by U.S. trading partners.

For countries like the United States, a large net external debt is created when the value of foreign assets (debt and equity) held by domestic residents is less than the value of domestic assets held by foreigners. In simple terms, as foreigners buy property in the U.S., this adds to the external debt. When this occurs in greater amounts than Americans buying property overseas, nations like the United States are said to be debtor nations, but this is not conventional debt like a loan obtained from a bank.

If the external debt represents foreign ownership of domestic assets, the result is that rental income, stock dividends, capital gains and other investment income is received by foreign investors, rather than by U.S. residents. On the other hand, when American debt is held by overseas investors, they receive interest and principal repayments. As the trade imbalance puts extra dollars in hands outside of the U.S., these dollars may be used to invest in new assets (foreign direct investment, such as new plants) or be used to buy existing American assets such as stocks, real estate and bonds. With a mounting trade deficit, the income from these assets increasingly transfers overseas.

Of major concern is the magnitude of the NIIP (or net external debt), which is larger than those of most national economies. Fueled by the sizable trade deficit, the external debt is so large that economists are concerned over whether the current account deficit is unsustainable. A complicating factor is that trading partners such as China, depend for much of their economy on exports, especially to America. There are many controversies about the current trade and external debt situation, and it is arguable whether anyone understands how these dynamics will play out in a historically unprecedented floating exchange rate system. While various aspects of the U.S. economic profile have precedents in the situations of other countries (notably government debt as a percentage of GDP), the sheer size of the U.S., and the integral role of the U.S. economy in the overall global economic environment, create considerable uncertainty about the future.

According to economists such as Larry Summers and Paul Krugman, the enormous inflow of capital from China is one of the causes of the global financial crisis of 2008–2009. China had been buying huge quantities of dollar assets to keep its currency value low and its export economy humming, which caused American interest rates and saving rates to remain artificially low. These low interest rates, in turn, contributed to the United States housing bubble because when mortgages are cheap, house prices are inflated as people can afford to borrow more.

Trade agreements

The United States is a partner to many trade agreements, shown in the chart below and the map to the right.

The United States has also negotiated many Trade and Investment Framework Agreements, which are often precursors to free trade agreements. It has also negotiated many bilateral investment treaties, which concern the movement of capital rather than goods.

The U.S. is a member of several international trade organizations. The purpose of joining these organizations is to come to agreement with other nations on trade issues, although there is domestic political controversy to whether or not the U.S. government should be making these trade agreements in the first place. These organizations include:
 World Trade Organization
 Organization of American States
 Security and Prosperity Partnership of North America

As of 26 February 2022, The United States  has barred most Russian imports including (semiconductors, lasers, liquor, computers) etc. due to the 2022 Russian-Ukraine War. This is the biggest bar on imports in the U.S. since WWll. The U.S. and Canada  partnered on the ban of liquor and food stuff on 25, February 2022 after it was announced that Russian troops had taken Chernobyl nuclear power plant.

Internal institutions
American foreign trade is regulated internally by:
 United States Court of International Trade
 United States International Trade Commission

Imports and exports

See also

 Federal Trade Commission Act
 Trade Act of 2002
 Trading with the Enemy Act 1917
 Trade wars
 Tariff in American history
 Mergers
 United States balance of trade

References

External links
 Comprehensive US Trade Data
 US Exports/Imports Trade Balance